The 2012 Italian Athletics Championships was the 102nd edition of the Italian Athletics Championships and were held in Brixen on 6-8 July 2012.

Champions

References

External links
 All results at FIDAL web site

Italian Athletics Championships
Athletics
Italian Athletics Outdoor Championships
Athletics competitions in Italy